Kerry “Arab” Skepple (born 25 November 1980) is an Antiguan and Barbudan footballer, currently playing for  Antigua Barracuda FC.

Club career
Skepple was born in New Winthropes, Antigua, and played for several teams in Antigua before attending college at Indiana Wesleyan University, United States, where he played from 2004-2007. In
2005 he was, along with compatriot Troy Mellanson, member of the MCC All-Conference 2nd Team 

In 2008, he spent some time in the Finnish second division with Atlantis FC for whom he scored a decisive goal to avoid relegation in October 2008.

He returned to Antigua and debuted for  All Saints United F.C. against Villa Lions on 23 November 2008.

International career
Skepple made his debut for Antigua and Barbuda in a February 2001 friendly match against Saint Lucia and has earned nearly 20 caps since. He played in 5 World Cup qualification games. On November 11, 2011 Skepple scored the winning goal against Haiti to qualify for the third round of CONCACAF qualifying for World Cup 2014.

National team statistics

References

External links 

Cricinfo Profile

Player profile - Atlantis FC

1980 births
Living people
Association football forwards
Antigua and Barbuda footballers
Antigua and Barbuda expatriate footballers
Antigua and Barbuda international footballers
Atlantis FC players
Antigua Barracuda F.C. players
Expatriate footballers in Finland
Antigua and Barbuda expatriate sportspeople in Finland
USL Championship players